The Ring: Terror's Realm (known simply as  in Japan) is a survival horror video game developed and published by Asmik Ace Entertainment in Japan and published by Infogrames North America in North America. It was released for Dreamcast on February 24, 2000 in Japan and September 29 in North America (it was originally set for a June 28 release date, but was delayed for unknown reasons). It is based on the Ring series of novels by Japanese author Suzuki Kouji, which also inspired the Japanese film Ring (1998) and its American remake, The Ring (2002).

Plot
Meg Rainman is a newly-hired researcher at the Centers for Disease Control (CDC) in the United States. Her boyfriend Robert is among four workers at the CDC who have died mysteriously on the same day, and the only thing that connects them is a program found in their computers, called "RING". When the CDC is put under lockdown, Meg finds herself imprisoned in the center with her co-workers, and inside the CDC Meg must find out the truth behind Robert's death and the "RING".

Characters

Meg Rainman

The game's protagonist and main character, takes Robert's position at the CDC after he dies at the start of the game.

Robert

Researcher at the CDC, was working on the Ring virus before he and three other colleagues die on the same day.

Jack Nikson

Works as a reporter, neighbour and friend of Meg and Robert.

John Brad

Boss at the CDC.

Chris

Co-worker at the CDC, works on the ground floor.

Kathy

Co-worker at the CDC, has a striking resemblance to Tina Turner, likes to cause trouble and is the girlfriend of Lukino.

Timothy

An old doctor working at the CDC.

Lukino

The CDC's security chief, has six piercings, two on both ears and one on the nose and left eye, and is the boyfriend of Kathy.

Reception

The game received "unfavorable" reviews according to the review aggregation website GameRankings. In Japan, Famitsu gave it a score of 24 out of 40.

In a review submitted to "the ringworld", a fansite dedicated to Ring, contributors C. Gavlas and K. Gavlas called it a crude, clumsy Resident Evil-style survival horror video game and a depressing homage to Ring. Those unfamiliar with Suzuki's works were equally unimpressed, such as Jeremy Dunham of IGN and a contributor to the PlanetDreamcast website (a part of GameSpy). GameSpot concluded in the review of the Japanese import that the survival-horror fans will try to play it, but ultimately recommended Code Veronica as superior title. Jim Preston of NextGen gave a negative review to the game.

References

External links
 

2000 video games
Infogrames games
Asmik Ace Entertainment games
Dreamcast games
Dreamcast-only games
2000s horror video games
Survival video games
The Ring (franchise)
Video games based on films
Video games developed in Japan
Single-player video games